The 2018 season was AIK's 127th in existence, their 90th season in Allsvenskan and their 13th consecutive season in the league. The team was competing in Allsvenskan, Svenska Cupen and UEFA Europa League.

Squad

Players out on loan

Transfers

In

Loans in

Out

Loans out

Released

Friendlies

Competitions

Overview

Allsvenskan

League table

Results summary

Results by round

Results

Svenska Cupen

2017–18

Group stage

Knock-out stage

2018–19

UEFA Europa League

Qualifying rounds

Squad statistics

Appearances and goals

|-
|colspan="16"|Players away on loan:

|-
|colspan="16"|Players who appeared for AIK but left during the season:

|}

Goal scorers

Clean sheets

Disciplinary record

References

AIK Fotboll season
AIK Fotboll seasons
Swedish football championship-winning seasons